Nikki Osborne (born 19 July 1981) is an Australian comedian, actress, television presenter and former model. Osborne is best known as a former host of the now-defunct late night interactive quiz series, Quizmania ( Nine Network, 2006–2007). Osborne has also featured in feature film productions such as the American mini-series, The Mystery of Natalie Wood (2003) and Ned (2004). She appeared in the sixth season of the Australian version of I'm a Celebrity...Get Me Out of Here!.

Career

Television
Osborne has appeared on Celebrity Name Game, Show Me the Movie! and Hughesy, We Have a Problem.

One of three originals, Osborne was a host on the Australian phone-in quiz show Quizmania, broadcast on the Nine Network in the late-night time slot (post-midnight). Osborne left the show on  12 May 2007 to work on the new Mick Molloy comedy series, The Nation.

In 2004 Osborne featured in American mini-series The Mystery of Natalie Wood, playing the part of Jackie Estes, Natalie Wood's best friend. That same year saw her play a part in the Australian television mini-series Jessica as the Thomas daughter, Gwendolyn.

Osborne has also featured in a number of television advertisements including for Australian chain of cinema multiplexes, Greater Union, footwear retailer The Athlete's Foot, Streets ice cream and for Capital One credit cards in the United States.

More recently, she appeared in a TV commercial for AAMI car insurance and was "Zoe" in the Australian Unity advertising campaign, featuring her as a 20-something blogger.

In July, 2014, Osborne was one of the ensemble cast in the Channel 7 sketch comedy Kinne, in a variety of roles revealing her genuine talent for madcap, Aussie humour.

In 2020, Osborne joined the sixth season of the Australian version of I'm a Celebrity...Get Me Out of Here!. She was eliminated on 19 January 2020 and finished in 13th place.

Film and music
Osborne was in the Australian film Ned in 2003, playing the role of a 14-year-old virginal whore named Tiffany.

In 2004 Osborne toured with performer Jon English as a lead singer.

Print publications
Via public demand, Osborne featured in the January 2007 edition of Ralph magazine.

The Nation
Osborne was also a cast member in the Nine Network sketch and current affairs comedy show The Nation, hosted by Mick Molloy. She was absent from episodes 10-12 of the run but returned for the final episode on Wednesday 29 August 2007.

Personal life
Osborne married long term boyfriend, Jamie Starr, on 6 October 2007 and the couple have two children together.

References

External links
 
 Nikki Osborne fan club and gallery
 MySpace website

1981 births
Living people
Australian television actresses
Australian film actresses
People from Brisbane
Australian women comedians
I'm a Celebrity...Get Me Out of Here! (Australian TV series) participants